They're Playing Our Song is a musical with a book by Neil Simon, lyrics by Carole Bayer Sager, and music by Marvin Hamlisch.

They're Playing Our Song may also refer to:
 They're Playin' Our Song, a 1995 song by Neal McCoy
 They're Playing Our Song (album), a 1965 album by Al Hirt
 They're Playing Our Song (Frasier), an episode of the television series Frasier
 "They're Playing Our Song" (Trinere song), 1986